Bass or Basses may refer to:

Fish
 Bass (fish), various saltwater and freshwater species

Music
 Bass (sound), describing low-frequency sound or one of several instruments in the bass range:
 Bass (instrument), including:
 Acoustic bass guitar, with a hollow body
 Bass clarinet, a clarinet with a lower sound
 Bass cornett, a low pitched wind instrument
 Bass drum, a large drum
 Bass flute, an instrument one octave lower than a flute
 Bass guitar, with a solid body and electric pickups
 Bass recorder, an instrument one octave lower than the alto recorder
 Bass sarrusophone, a low pitched double reed instrument
 Bass saxophone
 Bass trombone, a lower pitched trombone
 Bass trumpet
 Bass violin
 Double bass, the largest and lowest pitched bowed string instrument
 Electric upright bass, the electric version of a double bass
 Tuba, often called "the bass" in the context of brass instruments
 Bass (voice type), a type of classical male singing voice
 Bass clef, the musical clef used for lower-sounding instruments and voices
 Bass music, broad category of electronic dance music genres, focusing on a prominent bass drum and/or bassline sound
 Bass note, the lowest note in a chord
 Bassline, or bass line, a term used in music for a lower-pitched part
 "Bass", audio file on Culture Vulture (EP) by Jesus Jones (2004)
 "Bass (How Low Can You Go)", a 1988 single by Simon Harris; also his 1989 album Bass!
 "Basses", a movement of Mike Oldfield's Tubular Bells 2003 album

Businesses and organizations
 Bass Brewery, a British brewery
 Bass Anglers Sportsman Society (B.A.S.S.)
 G.H. Bass & Co., an American footwear brand founded in 1876

People
 Bass (surname)
 Bass Reeves (1838–1910), notable deputy U.S. marshal

Fictional characters
 Chuck Bass, a fictional character in the novel and television series Gossip Girl
 Bass Armstrong, a character from Dead or Alive
 Bass Monroe, fictional character in Revolution
 Bass and Bass.EXE, Mega Man characters

Places

Australia
 Bass Strait, between Australia and Tasmania
 Bass Pyramid, a small island in the Bass Strait
 Bass, Victoria, a town in Australia
 Bass Coast Shire, a local government area in Victoria
 Division of Bass, a federal electoral division in Tasmania, Australia
 Division of Bass (state), state electoral division in Tasmania, Australia
 Electoral district of Bass, a state electoral division in Victoria, Australia
 Shire of Bass, a former local government area in Victoria, Australia

United States
 Bass, Alabama, an unincorporated community in Jackson County, Alabama, U.S.
 Bass, Arkansas, an unincorporated community in Newton County, Arkansas, U.S.
 Bass, Casey County, Kentucky, U.S.
 Bass, Missouri, U.S.
 Bass, West Virginia, U.S.
 Bass Creek, a stream in Missouri
 Bass Lake (disambiguation), a number of places and lakes
 Bass River (disambiguation)
 Nancy Lee and Perry R. Bass Performance Hall, or simply Bass Performance Hall, in Fort Worth, Texas, U.S.

Elsewhere
 Bass, Hansi, a sub-tehsil of Hisar district, Haryana, India
 Bass Lake (Ontario), several lakes
 Bass River (disambiguation)
 Bass Rock, or the Bass, an island in the outer part of the Firth of Forth in the east of Scotland
 Basses, Vienne, a commune of the Vienne department in France

Other uses
 Bass diffusion model, or Bass model, a mathematical marketing model
 Beneath a Steel Sky, a 1994 computer adventure game
 Buttocks, in slang
 , a freeware cross-platform audio library and API
 USS Bass, several vessels of the U.S. Navy

See also

 Bas (disambiguation)
 Base (disambiguation)
 Bass House (disambiguation)
 Basse (disambiguation)
 Bassline (disambiguation)
 Drum and bass, a type of electronic dance music
 Figured bass, a kind of integer musical notation
 Miami bass, a type of hip hop music
 Ghettotech or Detroit Bass, a form of electronic dance music
 Sebastian (name)